A list of films produced in Turkey in 1979 (see 1979 in film):

See also
1979 in Turkey

References

Lists of Turkish films
1979